Sun Jinming (born March 1965) is a lieutenant general in the People's Liberation Army of China.

He is an alternate member of the 20th Central Committee of the Chinese Communist Party.

Biography
Sun was born in Taizhou, Jiangsu, in March 1965. 

He was promoted to deputy commander of the 52th Base of the Second Artillery Force in 2015. In 2017, he was promoted again to commander the 69th Base of the Second Artillery Force. In 2018, he was appointed commander the 64th Base of the Second Artillery Force, he remained in that position until March 2022, when he was chosen as chief of staff of the People's Liberation Army Rocket Force.

He was promoted to the rank of major general (shaojiang) in August 2016 and lieutenant general (zhongjiang) in March 2022.

References

1965 births
Living people
People from Taizhou, Jiangsu
People's Liberation Army generals from Jiangsu
People's Republic of China politicians from Jiangsu
Chinese Communist Party politicians from Jiangsu
Alternate members of the 20th Central Committee of the Chinese Communist Party